Pak Khlong (also spelled Pak Klong) may refer to:
Pak Khlong, a subdistrict in the Amphoe Pathio district in southern Thailand
Pak Khlong Bang Pla Kot, a subdistrict in the Amphoe Phra Samut Chedi district in central Thailand
Pak Khlong Phasi Charoen, a subdistrict in the Phasi Charoen district in Bangkok, Thailand
Pak Khlong Talat, a flower market in Bangkok, Thailand
Ban Pak Khlong, a village in the Ho Khlong subdistrict in northern Thailand
Ban Pak Khlong Chlong, a village in the Mathong subdistrict in northern Thailand
Wat Pak Khlong, a temple in Tha Tan, northern Thailand